The Academic Male Voice Choir of Helsinki, abbreviated AS, colloquially also known as , is a Finland-Swedish academic male-voice choir in Helsinki, Finland. The choir was founded in 1838 by Fredrik Pacius and is the oldest extant choir in Finland. It is one of two male-voice choirs affiliated with the University of Helsinki, the other being the oldest extant Finnish-language choir, the YL Male Voice Choir. Furthermore, it is one of two Swedish-language choirs affiliated with the University of Helsinki, the other being the Academic Female Voice Choir Lyran.

History

Overview

Akademiska Sångföreningen was founded no later than during the spring term of 1838 by Fredrik Pacius, music lecturer at the Imperial Alexander University of Finland (today the University of Helsinki) and sometimes known as "the father of Finnish music", originally under the name . The choir is thus the oldest extant one in Finland. The name  was introduced no later than in 1846.

During the 19th century the choir became a symbol of national awakening in the emerging Finnish nation, at the time part of the Russian Empire as the Grand Duchy of Finland. On 13 May 1848, Pacius' composition , set to the poem by Johan Ludvig Runeberg, was performed for the first time by the choir, conducted by Pacius, during the students' celebration of the Flora Day. The composition was to become the national anthem of the Finnish nation.

In the 1850s and 60s, elite triple quartets from within the choir's ranks participated in raising the funds necessary to build what is today known as the Old Student House in Helsinki, by travelling the country performing. The Old Student House was finished in 1870 and is still the location for the choir's weekly rehearsals.

During the second half of the 20th century, the choir, directed by modernist Erik Bergman, came to carve out new paths for the male-voice choir tradition in Finland, proving that this genre of music was able to exhibit superior musical qualities as well. After Bergman, jazz musician Henrik Otto Donner carried on this tradition.

At end of the 1970s and the beginning of the 80s the choir was engaged in lighter types of music. The  concerts in Finlandia Hall were decidedly successful and, when necessary, members of the choir would compose pieces of music themselves.

During the 20th century the choir had several prominent conductors: Bengt Carlson, Nils-Eric Fougstedt, Erik Bergman, Henrik Otto Donner, Markus Westerlund, Eric-Olof Söderström, Tom Eklundh, John Schultz and Henrik Wikström all directed the choir. The most recent chief conductor Dr Kari Turunen, Doctor of Music, was appointed 2008 and stepped down in 2019 after the spring term, having been appointed artistic director of the Vancouver Chamber Choir, beginning the autumn term 2019. In June 2019, Elisa Huovinen, Master of Music, was appointed his successor as chief conductor of Akademiska Sångföreningen.

List of chief conductors

The chief conductor is the artistic director of the choir.

List of presidents
The president is the chairman of the committee.

Present activities

Being the oldest extant male voice choir in Finland, Akademiska Sångföreningen has always cared particularly for the classical Finnish male voice repertoire. Among the composers whose compositions form part of the choir's standard repertoire are honorary members Jean Sibelius, Selim Palmgren and Erik Bergman, as well as fellow composers Toivo Kuula and Leevi Madetoja. Furthermore, being a Finland-Swedish organization, the choir has always seen it as a natural and important task to champion the Swedish-speaking minority culture in Finland. Hence, the standard repertoire encompasses not only choral works of Finnish and Finland-Swedish origin, but also many works of Swedish origin, for example by honorary member Hugo Alfvén.

As implied by its name, the choir is an academic or students' choir, and like its Helsinki sister choir the Academic Female Voice Choir Lyran  an independent 'music corporation' affiliated with the University of Helsinki. The choir presently comprises some 50 active singers, many of whom are university students. Concerts are given regularly in Finland, and the choir travels abroad frequently. In addition to most European countries, the choir has been on tour in Australia, New Zealand, Canada, the United States, Hong Kong, the Philippines, and Singapore.

Particularly in recent years, the choir has devoted itself to actively producing records, explicitly in order to document high quality male voice choir repertoire in Swedish. Apart from Swedish, the choir also sings in the parody language Transpiranto on the record Happi kvam pippi, which was released in 2006. A later album, Hymn to Finland, was produced by Swedish label BIS Records and documents works for male voice choir by founder Fredrik Pacius. The record was released on 19 March 2009, the 200th anniversary of Pacius' birth.

The choir maintains contacts with other similar choirs, in Finland in particular with male voice academic choirs Brahe Djäknar in Turku and the YL Male Voice Choir in Helsinki, and in Sweden in particular with Orphei Drängar in Uppsala, Stockholm Academic Male Chorus in Stockholm, Linköping University Male Voice Choir in Linköping and Lund University Male Voice Choir in Lund.

Ever since 1954, the choir has collaborated extensively with the Academic Female Voice Choir Lyran, the only other Swedish-language University of Helsinki choir. The two choirs give several annually recurring concerts together.

Discography

Notes

Citations

References

Further reading

External links

 Official website 
 Official English webpage
 University of Helsinki
 Student Union of the University of Helsinki
 Arkivet: "Akademiska sångföreningen är Finlands äldsta kör" 

University choirs
Boys' and men's choirs
Finnish choirs
Musical groups established in 1838
1838 establishments in Finland
19th century in Helsinki